The discography of Canadian alternative rock band Barenaked Ladies consists of 13 primary studio albums, three themed studio albums, 41 singles, three live albums, two greatest hits compilations, and three video releases. This list does not include material recorded by band members individually or with other side projects.

Barenaked Ladies was formed in 1988 by Steven Page and Ed Robertson, both singer-songwriter guitarists. Andy and Jim Creeggan joined the group on percussion and bass respectively approximately a year later. In mid-1990, Tyler Stewart joined the band as drummer with Andy Creeggan shifting to keyboards after returning from an exchange trip. Andy Creeggan left the band before the mid-1995 sessions for its third album (recorded as a four-piece). He was replaced by Kevin Hearn later on in 1995. The band's lineup remained unchanged until Page left the band in early 2009. They have sold at least 15 million records including albums and singles.

Albums

Pre-label releases
The following albums were recorded and released prior to the band's first major record deal. They are essentially demo/promo tapes, though the Yellow Tape became commercially successful.

Studio albums
The following are LP length studio albums which contain original material with no specified theme or topic:

Themed/topical studio albums
The following are studio albums whose content has a specified unifying topic or purpose. This includes a holiday album, a soundtrack to a Stratford Shakespeare production, and an album of songs geared towards children.

Extended plays
Barenaked Ladies have released one extended play disc consisting of commercially unreleased tracks (new songs or new versions), which also included enhanced multimedia content. Other EP releases were download-only compilations of previously released tracks.

Compilation albums
Barenaked Ladies have released two greatest hits compilations (the first was released November 13, 2001, the second on September 27, 2011), as well as an iTunes Music Store-exclusive iTunes Originals which compiles old tracks along with newly recorded live performances and interviews. A compilation of 12 unreleased demos, b-sides, remixes and live recordings from 1992 to 2003 was released May 8, 2012.

Live albums
Barenaked Ladies has three true commercial live album releases as released by the band's label at that time. The band has also recorded and released many of their regular concerts for their fans both digitally and in directly retailed physical media (CDs and flash drives), though these are typically mixed live during the show and are released as-is. Some of these concert recordings have become available in through some commercial retailers in both digital and CD form, though these are not considered a part of the band's primary discography. Similarly, a compilation of these live tracks, released in 2006 as part of the Extended Versions album series, is not considered a part of the band's primary discography.

{| class="wikitable"
! rowspan="2"| Year
! rowspan="2"| Album
! colspan="3"|Chart positions
! rowspan="2"| Certifications(sales thresholds)
|-
!style="width:2em;font-size:75%"| CAN
!style="width:2em;font-size:75%"| US
!style="width:2em;font-size:75%"| UK
|-
| 1996
| Rock Spectacle
Released: November 19, 1996
Label: Reprise
Format: CD, Cassette
| align="center"| —
| align="center"| 86
| align="center"| —
| 
 RIAA: Platinum
|- 
| 2004 
|Everything to Everyone Tour Recordings
Released: February–May 2004 
Label: Nettwerk 
Format: CD, Digital 
| align="center"| —
| align="center"| —
| align="center"| —
| 
|-
| 2006
| Extended VersionsReleased: November 29, 2006
Label: Sony BMG Music Entertainment
Format: CD
| align="center"| —
| align="center"| —
| align="center"| —
|
|-
| 2007
| Talk to the Hand: Live in MichiganReleased: November 6, 2007
Label: Desperation Records
Format: CD, DVD
| align="center"| —
| align="center"| —
| align="center"| —
|
|-
| 2016
| BNL Rocks Red Rocks 
Released: May 20, 2016
Label: Vanguard Records
Format: CD
| align="center"| —
| align="center"| 101
| align="center"| —
|
|}

Collaboration albums
Barenaked Ladies collaborated with New York a cappella group The Persuasions in October 2016. During the 2 day session, they recorded 15 songs that would later become a collaboration album, titled Ladies and Gentlemen: Barenaked Ladies and The Persuasions. The album was released April 14, 2017.

Singles

 Music videos 

DVD/Video releases

Alternate format releases

Flash drive

Other songs

Songs recorded for non-album use
"Lovers in a Dangerous Time" on Kick at the Darkness (1991) (later included on Disc One) - a cover of Bruce Cockburn for a tribute album
"The Ballad of Gordon" as a PSA for FOX around the release of Gordon
"Fight the Power" on Coneheads soundtrack (1993) - a cover of Public Enemy
"Grim Grinning Ghosts" on Disney's Music From The Park (1996)
"Gangster Girl" for The Wrong Guy film (1997)
"Get in Line" on King of the Hill soundtrack (1999) (later included on Disc One)
"When Doves Cry" on Andrew Denton's Musical Challenge Vol. 2, a Prince cover recorded for the Andrew Denton Breakfast Show on Australia's Triple M Radio (1999)
"Green Christmas" on The Grinch soundtrack (2000) - later re-recorded for Maybe This Christmas Too? (2003), and again for Barenaked for the Holidays; included on various other holiday compilations
"La La La La Lemon" on For the Kids (2002)
"One Little Slip" on Chicken Little soundtrack (2005)
"Legal Age Life at Variety Store" on The Secret Sessions (2007) - recorded live at their February 12, 2007 concert in Regina, SK with Jason Plumb and Tim Mech
"The Other Day I Met a Bear" on The Simple Life: Camp Songs (2007)
"I.S.S. (Is Somebody Singing)" (2013) - featuring Chris Hadfield and the Wexford Gleeks, commissioned by the Canadian Broadcasting Corporation and the Canadian Space Agency for the International Space Station

Theme songsRoyal Canadian Air Farce (1993)Seven Little Monsters (2000)The Big Bang Theory'' - Big Bang Theory Theme (2007)
"TFC" - Official team theme for Toronto FC of Major League Soccer (2007)

References

External links
 
 Entry at 45cat.com

Discographies of Canadian artists
Rock music group discographies
Discography